Christian Barmore (born July 28, 1999) is an American football defensive tackle for the New England Patriots of the National Football League (NFL). He played college football at Alabama and was drafted by the Patriots in the second round of the 2021 NFL Draft.

Early life and high school
Barmore grew up in Philadelphia, Pennsylvania, and attended Abraham Lincoln High School his freshman year before transferring to Saints John Neumann and Maria Goretti Catholic High School. Barmore originally verbally committed to play college football at Temple during the summer going into his senior year, but de-committed and reopened his recruitment. Barmore ultimately signed to play at Alabama over offers from Baylor, Florida, Georgia, and LSU.

College career
Barmore redshirted his true freshman season. As a redshirt freshman, he played in 12 games and made 26 tackles, including six tackles for loss and two sacks and was named to the SEC All-Freshman team. Barmore was named first-team All-SEC as a redshirt sophomore, finishing the season with 37 total tackles, 9.5 tackles for loss, and eight sacks with three forced fumbles and three passes defended. He was named the Defensive MVP of the 2021 College Football Playoff National Championship game after making five tackles, including two for a loss and one sack in Alabama's 52-24 win over Ohio State. Following the national title game, Barmore announced that he would forgo his remaining two years of eligibility and enter the 2021 NFL Draft.

Professional career

Barmore was selected by the New England Patriots in the second round (38th overall) of the 2021 NFL Draft. Barmore was the first defensive tackle selected. He signed his four-year rookie contract, worth $8.5 million, on July 21, 2021. He played in all 17 games and was named to the PFWA All-Rookie Team.

On November 18, 2022, Barmore was placed on injured reserve. He was activated on December 17.

References

External links 
 New England Patriots bio
 Alabama Crimson Tide bio

1999 births
Living people
American football defensive tackles
Players of American football from Philadelphia
Alabama Crimson Tide football players
New England Patriots players